Neaveia is a monotypic butterfly genus in the family Lycaenidae which is endemic to the Afrotropical realm. Its only species, Neaveia lamborni, the pierine blue, is found in Ivory Coast, Ghana, Nigeria, Cameroon, the Republic of the Congo, the Democratic Republic of the Congo, Uganda, Kenya and Tanzania. Both the genus and species were first described by Hamilton Herbert Druce in 1910. The habitat consists of forests and open areas.

Subspecies
 Neaveia lamborni lamborni (Ivory Coast, Ghana, Nigeria: south and the Cross River loop, Cameroon)
 Neaveia lamborni orientalis Jackson, 1962 (Congo, Democratic Republic of the Congo: Uele, western Uganda, western Kenya, north-western Tanzania)

References

Poritiinae
Monotypic butterfly genera
Taxa named by Hamilton Herbert Druce
Lycaenidae genera